The Paschal greeting, also known as the Easter Acclamation, is an Easter custom among Eastern Orthodox, Oriental Orthodox, Catholic, and Anglican Christians. It is also found among some Christians from liturgical Protestant denominations, such as certain Anglicans and Lutherans.

Similar responses are also used in the liturgies of other Christian churches, but not so much as general greetings.

Examples

Eastern Orthodox
The greeting and reply are:

Christ is Risen! – Truly He is Risen!

In the original language, 
In the most widely used language, 

A list in 57 languages is found at the website of the Orthodox Church in America.

In some cultures, such as in Russia and Serbia, it is also customary to exchange a triple kiss of peace on the alternating cheeks after the greeting.

Catholic
In the Latin Church the traditional greeting on Easter morning and throughout the entire Easter week is: Christus surréxit! - Surréxit vere, allelúja. ("Christ is risen" - "He is risen indeed. Alleluia!"). This ancient phrase echoes the greeting of the angel to Mary Magdalene, to Mary the mother of James, and to Joseph, as they arrived at the sepulchre to anoint the body of Jesus: "He is not here; for he has risen, as he said" (Matt 28:6).  It is used among Catholics when meeting one another during Eastertide; some even answer their telephones with the phrase.

References

External links
 The Origin and Meaning of the Paschal Greeting, Russian Orthodox Cathedral of St. John the Baptist, Washington, DC.

Eastern Orthodox liturgy
Easter liturgy
Christian terminology
Greeting words and phrases